Roberto Zanetti (born 28 November 1956) is an Italian singer and music producer from Massa, Tuscany. As a singer, he is known under the stage name Savage and as a music producer he uses the alias Robyx.

In 1989, he recorded "I Just Died in Your Arms" (a hi-NRG remake of the Cutting Crew song), as well as a greatest hits album. In 1994, he released another album, Strangelove, containing a number of remixes of his older songs and four mixes of the song "Strangelove" (by Depeche Mode). The last single which was released by Savage was "Don't You Want Me", which appeared on his own label, Dance World Attack Records (DWA) in 1994. This track does not appear on the Strangelove album.

Is the music composer of "Think About The Way" of Ice Mc, as Robyx

At the beginning of 2019, Zanetti started the recordings of a new album "Love and Rain", the first studio album after the successful "Tonight" album of 1984. During the album's promoting company he worked with multiple European labels, including Polish MagicRecords and Russian RDS Records, living in Poland at that time. The new album was released at the beginning of 2020 and includes 14 new songs.

Discography

Studio / remix / compilation albums

Singles

References 

General sources
https://www.discogs.com/artist/15529-Savage?type=Releases&filter_anv=0
The Eurodance Encyclopaedia

External links 

DWA Records – Robyx's official record label's website
Interview with Roberto Zanetti
Savage history and discography
'Think About The Way' Credits

1956 births
Living people
People from Massa
Italian male songwriters
Italian male singers
Italian Italo disco musicians